Good Cider is a 1914 American silent comedy film featuring Oliver Hardy.

Plot

Cast
 James Levering as The Squire
 Ben Walker as Zeke
 Billy Bowers as Hank
 Oliver Hardy as Hiram (as Babe Hardy)
 Julia Calhoun as Aunt Jane

See also
 List of American films of 1914
 Oliver Hardy filmography

References

External links

1914 films
1914 short films
American silent short films
American black-and-white films
1914 comedy films
Silent American comedy films
American comedy short films
1910s American films
1910s English-language films